Konzen is a surname. Notable people with the surname include:

Joel Matthias Konzen (born 1950), American Roman Catholic bishop
Neil Konzen, American computer specialist
Pedro Henrique Konzen (born 1990), Brazilian football player